Cheikh Said (frequently spelled Sheikh Said) is a rocky peninsula in Yemen, near the island of Perim on the Bab-el-Mandeb at the entrance to the Red Sea.  In 1868 it was purchased from the local ruler, Sheikh Ali Tabet Ahmed, by Bazin et Rabaud, a private company based in Marseille in France, which wanted to use it as a base for exporting coffee.  The purchase price was 80,000 thalers.  In 1869, the sheikh annulled the agreement as he had received only 18,000 thalers.  Bazin et Rabaud and some allies in the French press attempted to press the French government to intervene, without success. In 1920, Cheikh Saïd was described as a "good landing-place, with an important telegraph station." Although as late as 1970, the Petit Larousse described it as having been a "French colony from 1868 to 1936", France never claimed formal jurisdiction or sovereignty over it.

In the days before World War I the Ottoman Empire maintained a small fort here guarding the entrance to the Red Sea. When Great Britain went to war with the Ottoman Empire in 1914, a landing was made from the armoured cruiser  which captured the fort and blew it up.

See also
French colonial empire
List of French possessions and colonies

References

History of Yemen